Atriplex serenana is a species of saltbush known by the common names bractscale and stinking orach. It is native to California and Baja California, where it grows in saline and alkaline soils such as those on alkali flats and beach bluffs.

This is a mat-forming annual herb producing scaly stems up to a meter long. The toothed leaves are 1 to 4 centimeters long. The flowers are generally borne in hard clusters along the stem and there is sometimes a spikelike inflorescence of male flowers at the end of the stem.

There are two varieties of this species. 
The rarer of the two, Davidson's saltscale (var. davidsonii), is limited to the coastline of southern California and Baja California.

References

External links
Jepson Manual Treatment
USDA Plants Profile
Flora of North America

serenana
Halophytes
Flora of Baja California
Flora of California
Flora of the Sierra Nevada (United States)
Flora of the California desert regions
Flora of the Sonoran Deserts
Natural history of the California chaparral and woodlands
Natural history of the Central Valley (California)
Natural history of the Channel Islands of California
Natural history of the Colorado Desert
Natural history of the Mojave Desert
Natural history of the Peninsular Ranges
Natural history of the Santa Monica Mountains
Natural history of the Transverse Ranges
Plants described in 1904
Flora without expected TNC conservation status